Rebel: Original Motion Picture Soundtrack is a soundtrack to the 1985 Australian film of the same name which is based on the play No Names, No Packdrill by Bob Herbert.

The album is credited to Matt Dillon and Debbie Byrne and features the vocals of Byrne, Shauna Jensen, Kim Deacon and Galapagos Duck.

Rebel: Original Motion Picture Soundtrack peaked at number 75 on the Australian Kent Music Report.

At the 1985 AFI Awards, the film was nominated for 9 awards, winning 5 including Best Original Music Award and Best Sound Award.

Track listing

Charts

References

Debra Byrne albums
1985 soundtrack albums
EMI Records albums
Soundtracks by Australian artists